The 1985 Bavarian Tennis Championships was a Grand Prix Tennis Circuit  tournament held in Munich, West Germany which was played on outdoor clay courts. It was the 69th edition of the tournament and was held form 6 May through 12 May 1985. Joakim Nyström won the singles title.

Finals

Singles

 Joakim Nyström defeated  Hans Schwaier 6–1, 6–0
 It was Nystrom's 1st title of the year and the 7th of his career.

Doubles

 Mark Edmondson /  Kim Warwick defeated  Sergio Casal /  Emilio Sánchez 4–6, 7–5, 7–5
 It was Edmondson's 1st title of the year and the 37th of his career. It was Warwick's 2nd title of the year and the 24th of his career.

References

External links 
 ATP tournament profile
 

 
Bavarian Tennis Championships
Bavarian Tennis Championships
Bavarian International Tennis Championships
Bavarian Tennis Championships
Bavarian Tennis Championships
German